Brampton is a civil parish in Cumbria, England.  It contains 84 listed buildings that are recorded in the National Heritage List for England.  Of these, four are listed at Grade I, the highest of the three grades, four are at Grade II*, the middle grade, and the others are at Grade II, the lowest grade.  The parish contains the town of Brampton, the village of Milton, and the surrounding countryside.  The largest building in the parish is Naworth Castle; this and associated structures are listed.  Being near the Scottish border, many of the buildings were fortified, and some bastle houses (fortified farmhouses) have survived, usually much altered.  Most of the listed buildings are in or near the centre of the town of Brampton, and include houses, shops, public houses, hotels, offices and banks, a police station, a church, and the moot hall.  In the countryside there are listed farmhouses and farm buildings.  The other listed buildings include milestones provided for the turnpikes in the parish, bridges, monuments, and a shelter.


Key

Buildings

References

Citations

Sources

Lists of listed buildings in Cumbria
Listed buildings